NGC 2146 is a barred spiral galaxy type SB(s)ab pec in the constellation Camelopardalis. The galaxy was discovered in 1876 by Friedrich August Theodor Winnecke.

It has a diameter of 80,000 lyr. The galaxy's most conspicuous feature is the dusty lanes of a spiral arm lying across the core of the galaxy as seen from Earth, the arm having been bent 45 degrees by a close encounter with a smaller galaxy possibly NGC 2146a about 0.8 billion years ago. This close encounter is credited with the relatively high rates of star formation that qualify NGC 2146 as a starburst galaxy.

It has been host to two known supernova events:
 SN 2005V, a type Ib/c supernova discovered by LIRIS on 30 January 2005.
 SN 2018zd, a type II supernova (possibly type IIn and maybe the first electron-capture supernova), was discovered on 2 March 2018 by Koichi Itagaki.

Gallery

References

External links
 

Barred spiral galaxies
Peculiar galaxies
Starburst galaxies
Luminous infrared galaxies
Camelopardalis (constellation)
2146
03429
018797